Kick In is a lost 1917 silent film crime melodrama directed by George Fitzmaurice and starring William Courtenay. It is based on the 1914 Broadway play of the same name by Willard Mack.

Cast
William Courtenay - Chick Hewes
Robert Clugston - Benny
Mollie King - Molly Cary
Richard Taber - Charlie (*as Richard Tabor)
Suzanne Willa - Myrtle Sylvester
John W. Boyle - Commissioner Garvey

See also
Kick In (1922)
Kick In (1931)

References

External links
Kick In at IMDb.com
allmovie/synopsis

1917 films
American silent feature films
Lost American films
Films directed by George Fitzmaurice
American films based on plays
American crime drama films
1917 crime drama films
1917 lost films
American black-and-white films
Films with screenplays by Ouida Bergère
Melodrama films
Lost drama films
1910s American films
Silent American drama films